Pristomyrmex is a genus of ants in the subfamily Myrmicinae.

Distribution and habitat
The genus is composed of 59 extant species restricted to the Old World tropics and a single extinct species, Pristomyrmex rasnitsyni, described from Scandinavian amber. Its center of diversity is the Oriental region, though species are also known from the Australian rainforests, Africa, Mauritius and Réunion. Most of the species inhabit the rainforest, forage as predators or scavengers, and tend to nest in soil, leaf litter or rotten wood.

Species

Pristomyrmex acerosus Wang, 2003
Pristomyrmex africanus Karavaiev, 1931
Pristomyrmex bicolor Emery, 1900
Pristomyrmex bispinosus (Donisthorpe, 1949)
Pristomyrmex boltoni Wang, 2003
Pristomyrmex brevispinosus Emery, 1887
Pristomyrmex browni Wang, 2003
Pristomyrmex cebuensis Zettel, 2007
Pristomyrmex coggii Emery, 1897
Pristomyrmex collinus Wang, 2003
Pristomyrmex costatus Wang, 2003
Pristomyrmex cribrarius Arnold, 1926
Pristomyrmex curvulus Wang, 2003
Pristomyrmex distinguendus Zettel, 2006
Pristomyrmex divisus Wang, 2003
Pristomyrmex eduardi Forel, 1914
Pristomyrmex erythropygus Taylor, 1968
Pristomyrmex flatus Wang, 2003
Pristomyrmex fossulatus (Forel, 1910)
Pristomyrmex foveolatus Taylor, 1965
Pristomyrmex fuscipennis (Smith, 1861)
Pristomyrmex hamatus Xu & Zhang, 2002
Pristomyrmex hirsutus Wang, 2003
Pristomyrmex inermis Wang, 2003
Pristomyrmex largus Wang, 2003
Pristomyrmex levigatus Emery, 1897
Pristomyrmex longispinus Wang, 2003
Pristomyrmex longus Wang, 2003
Pristomyrmex lucidus Emery, 1897
Pristomyrmex mandibularis Mann, 1921
Pristomyrmex minusculus Wang, 2003
Pristomyrmex modestus Wang, 2003
Pristomyrmex nitidissimus Donisthorpe, 1949
Pristomyrmex obesus Mann, 1919
Pristomyrmex occultus Wang, 2003
Pristomyrmex orbiceps (Santschi, 1914)
Pristomyrmex picteti Emery, 1893
Pristomyrmex pollux Donisthorpe, 1944
Pristomyrmex profundus Wang, 2003
Pristomyrmex pulcher Wang, 2003
Pristomyrmex punctatus (Smith, 1860)
Pristomyrmex quadridens Emery, 1897
Pristomyrmex quadridentatus (André, 1905)
Pristomyrmex quindentatus Wang, 2003
†Pristomyrmex rasnitsyni Dlussky & Radchenko, 2011
Pristomyrmex reticulatus Donisthorpe, 1949
Pristomyrmex rigidus Wang, 2003
Pristomyrmex rugosus Zettel, 2006
Pristomyrmex schoedli Zettel, 2006
Pristomyrmex simplex Wang, 2003
Pristomyrmex sulcatus Emery, 1895
Pristomyrmex thoracicus Taylor, 1965
Pristomyrmex trachylissus (Smith, 1858)
Pristomyrmex trispinosus (Donisthorpe, 1946)
Pristomyrmex trogor Bolton, 1981
Pristomyrmex tsujii Sarnat & Economo, 2013
Pristomyrmex umbripennis (Smith, 1863)
Pristomyrmex wheeleri Taylor, 1965
Pristomyrmex wilsoni Taylor, 1968

References

External links

Myrmicinae
Ant genera
Hymenoptera of Asia
Hymenoptera of Africa
Hymenoptera of Australia